Linda Porter (January 31, 1933 – September 25, 2019) was an American actress. She appeared in numerous feature films, television programs, advertisements and music videos—most prominently in the series Superstore and Twin Peaks and the film Dude, Where's My Car?. She died of cancer on September 25, 2019.

Selected filmography

Beauty and the Beast (1988, TV series) as Elizabeth
Who Gets the Friends? (1988, TV movie) as Manya
Baby M (1988, TV Mini-series) as Dr. Einwohner
Twins (1988) as Painter
Murder, She Wrote (1992, TV series) as Clerk
Frasier (1994, TV series) as Mary
Roseanne (1995, TV series short) as Bev's Friend
Mad About You (1995, TV series) as Mark's Grateful Patient
The Truth About Cats & Dogs (1996) as Newscast Auditioner
Hang Time (1996, TV series) as Martha
Wings (1996, TV series) as Little Old Lady
Becoming Rebecca (1996) as Ella
The Naked Truth (1997, TV series) as Edwina
ER (1998, TV series) as Inga Paulson
The X-Files (1998, TV series) as Elderly Woman
Tumbleweeds (1999) as Mrs. Boman
Melrose Place (1999, TV series) as Nun
G vs E (1999, TV series) as Mother Character
The Mating Habits of the Earthbound Human (1999) as The Wise Old Woman
Get Real (1999, TV series) as Office Assistant
The Phantom Eye (1999, TV series) as Old Woman
Diagnosis: Murder (2000, TV series) as Miss Winkle
Stanley's Gig (2000) as Alice
Partners (2000, TV movie) as Older Woman
Even Stevens (2000, TV series) as Lady in the Street
Dharma & Greg (2000, TV series) as Becky
Judging Amy (2000, TV series) as Ms. Duncan
When Billie Beat Bobby (2001, TV movie) as Old Woman
Malcolm in the Middle (2001, TV series) as Audrey
Dude, Where's My Car? (2000) as Mrs. Crabbleman
Gilmore Girls (2001–2003, TV series) as Fran Weston
Girlfriends (2003, TV series) as Mrs. Nussbaum
Strong Medicine (2003, TV series)
Duplex (2003) as Old Biddy #2
Boomtown (2003, TV series) as Shirley Donadoni
Phil of the Future (2004, TV series) as Grandma Berwick
What I Like About You (2004, TV series) as Old Woman
Scrubs (2004, TV series) as Old Woman
Committed (2005, TV series) as Woman in Elevator
The King of Queens (2005, TV series) as Eloise
Out of Practice (2005, TV series) as Doris
Queen of Cactus Cove (2005, short) as Mrs. Wadsworth
That's So Raven (2006, TV series) as Gertie Grossman
My Name Is Earl (2008, TV series) as Doris Johannssen
Uncross the Stars (2008) as Phyllis
CSI: NY (2010, TV series) as Mary Riesling
How I Met Your Mother (2010, Episode: "Home Wreckers") as Muriel
The Suite Life on Deck (2011, TV series) as Grammy Picket
American Horror Story: Murder House (2011, TV series) as Mary, Violet's Grandmother
The Middle (2012, TV series) as Grandma Dot
The Mindy Project (2012, TV series) as Grandma Putch
Bunheads (2013, TV series) as Mrs. Weidemeyer
2 Broke Girls (2013, TV series) as Grace
Mercy (2014) as Henrietta
Togetherness (2015, TV series) as Elderly Reporter
Pee-wee's Big Holiday (2016) as Mrs. Rose
Superstore (2016–2019, TV series) as Myrtle Vartanian (recurring role) (final appearance)
The House (2017) as Old Lady
Twin Peaks (2017, TV series) as Lady Slot-Addict

Other appearances
Porter appeared as the sample lady in a series of Nature Valley Cereal television commercials, which aired in the United States. She played the bakery owner on Gilmore Girls. She also played the part of the demonic old lady at the end of the Tenacious D music video "Tribute".

References

External links

1933 births
2019 deaths
American film actresses
American television actresses
Place of death missing
Actresses from Cleveland
20th-century American actresses
21st-century American actresses